Gerard Willem le Heux (May 7, 1885 in Deventer – June 8, 1973 in The Hague) was a Dutch horse rider  who competed in the 1928 Summer Olympics and in the 1936 Summer Olympics.

In the 1928 Summer Olympics he won the bronze medal in the team dressage with his horse Valérine after finishing twelfth in the individual dressage.

Eight years later he finished fifth with the Dutch team in the team dressage and placed nineteenth in the individual dressage.

References

1885 births
1973 deaths
Dutch dressage riders
Equestrians at the 1928 Summer Olympics
Equestrians at the 1936 Summer Olympics
Olympic equestrians of the Netherlands
Dutch male equestrians
Olympic bronze medalists for the Netherlands
Sportspeople from Deventer
Olympic medalists in equestrian
Medalists at the 1928 Summer Olympics
20th-century Dutch people